The NS 3400 was a series of goods steam locomotives of the Dutch Railways (NS), ordered by its predecessor the Hollandsche IJzeren Spoorweg-Maatschappij (HSM).

Around 1920, the HSM ordered a goods version of the class 501-535 from the factory Berliner Maschinenbau (formerly Schwartzkopff) in Berlin, to be delivered as the class 821-840. Due to the merging of the fleet of the HSM and the SS in 1921, the locomotives were delivered with the NS numbers 4101-4120. In the same year, the locomotives were renumbered in the definitive numbering as series 3401-3420. During the Second World War, three quarters of the series (3401-3412, 3415, 3419 and 3420) were deported to Germany, of which thirteen returned. The 3411 and 3420 did not return and were administratively removed in 1950. NS 3420 was still shunting in Rostock until 1950. 

In 1951, NS 3411 and 3420 were scrapped in Hagenow-Land. Of the five locomotives that remained in the Netherlands, two were sold and six of the returned thirteen locomotives were repaired and put back into service. Until 1953, these served mainly in the Rietlanden and for the oil trains from Schoonebeek to Pernis. The that locomotives were beyond repair were withdrawn in 1947.

Gallery

Sources and references 

 

 

 

 

Rolling stock of the Netherlands
Berliner locomotives
Steam locomotives of the Netherlands
Hollandsche IJzeren Spoorweg-Maatschappij